Fairfield University Men's Club Volleyball Team (FUMCVB) is a men's college volleyball club based at Fairfield University in Fairfield, Connecticut. The team competes in Division 1 West of the New England Collegiate Volleyball League (NECVL) after winning the NECVL Division 2 two straight years between 2006 and 2007.

Organization
The team competes year-round in league matches and tournaments in the northeastern US as well as nationally.  The club is organized and operated by player-elected officers that are chosen at the end of each season. The current officer positions are President, Vice President, Secretary, and Treasurer. The club is supported by dues paid by every club member and through funding provided by the University. The club annually attracts over 30 students at tryouts and maintains a roster of approximately 15 student athletes. Student-athletes are expected to attend practice 2-3 times per week, as well as attending conditioning sessions during the week.  The season begins in late September and concludes at NIRSA Nationals in mid-April.

History
While the university recognized men's club volleyball in the mid 1990s, the team was officially founded in 1998 and recognized as a member of the New England Club Volleyball League (NECVL) in 1999.  While still relatively young, the team is one of the most accomplished sport clubs at Fairfield University.

The FUMCVB team concluded their 2008 season falling in the second round of the Silver Bracket of the NIRSA National Club Volleyball Tournament in Dallas, TX, good enough for a #17th ranking nationally in Division 2 (student body less than 10,000).  They finished their league play with a 7-2 league record with victories over Columbia University, Dartmouth College, University of Connecticut, University of New Hampshire and Yale.  They fell to Yale in the Quarterfinals of the 2008 NECVL League Championships held at Fairfield University.

From 1999 - 2007 the team competed in the NECVL, gaining back-to-back Division 2 league championships in 2006 and 2007.  The team went undefeated in league play in 2007, winning nearly 20 league matches without losing a single game.  Between 2006 and 2007 the team only lost one league match, winning nearly 40 league matches in two years.

The team has garnered two national Top 25 finishes at NIRSA Nationals, achieving that status in 2006 and 2008.

This season Tyler Ostrowski, part of the Fairfield University Moneysquad made some filthy sets to help the Men's team win regionals and secure the ship.

Accomplishments

2019-2020 Members
Thomas Botelho '20 - Middle - President
Jack Power '20 - Middle - Vice President

Alex Baker '20 - TS/Coach - Treasurer
Han Bin Yoo '20 - Libero - Ambassador
Andrew Duchemin '20 - Middle
Lucas Santiago '20 - Outside Hitter

Marc Stacey '21 - Libero

Matthew Coleslaw '21 - Outside Hitter
Joe Diacetis '21 - Outside Hitter
Matt Mangano '21 - Outside Hitter
Kevin Kryzwick '21 - Outside Hitter
Trav Devlin '21 - Setter
Mike Wishart '22 - Setter - Underclassman Representative
Quan Oliver '22 - Libero
Sam Hines '22 - Outside Hitter
Peter Toutoulis '22 - Weakside Hitter
Max Honig '23 - Libero
Sean Conmy '23 - Middle
Will Bradshaw '23 - Weakside Hitter
KAFO '23 - Middle/Outside Hitter/Setter

References

College men's volleyball teams in the United States
Fairfield Stags volleyball